The black-capped chickadee (Poecile atricapillus) is a small, non-migratory, North American songbird that lives in deciduous and mixed forests. It is a passerine bird in the tit family, the Paridae. It is the state bird of Massachusetts and Maine in the United States, and the provincial bird of New Brunswick in Canada. It is well known for its ability to lower its body temperature during cold winter nights, its good spatial memory to relocate the caches where it stores food, and its boldness near humans (sometimes feeding from the hand).

Taxonomy
In 1760, French zoologist Mathurin Jacques Brisson included a description of the black-capped chickadee in his Ornithologie based on a specimen collected in Canada. He used the French name  and the Latin Parus Canadensis Atricapillus. Although Brisson coined Latin names, these do not conform to the binomial system and are not recognised by the International Commission on Zoological Nomenclature. When in 1766, Swedish naturalist Carl Linnaeus updated his Systema Naturae for the 12th edition, he added 240 species that had been previously described by Brisson. One of these was the black-capped chickadee. Linnaeus included a brief description, coined the binomial name Parus atricapillus and cited Brisson's work. The type location was subsequently restricted to the site of Quebec in Canada. The specific epithet atricapillus is Latin for 'black-haired' from  'black' and  'hair of the head'.

Though originally placed in the genus Parus with most other tits, mtDNA cytochrome b sequence data and morphology suggest that separating Poecile more adequately expresses these birds' relationships. The genus Poecile had been introduced by German naturalist Johann Jakob Kaup in 1829. Molecular phylogenetic studies have shown that the black-capped chickadee is sister to the mountain chickadee (Poecile gambeli).

At one time, the black-capped chickadee was considered by some to be conspecific with the willow tit of Eurasia, due to their very similar appearance. This is reflected in an older version of the Peterson Field Guide for the Birds of Britain and Europe, which states "N Am. Black-Capped Chickadee" as an alternate name for the willow tit. In fact, the willow tit, black-capped chickadee, marsh tit, and Carolina chickadee are all very similar to one another in appearance. Nine subspecies are recognised.

Description
 
The black-capped chickadee has a black cap and "bib" with white sides to the face. Its underparts are white with rusty brown on the flanks. Its back is gray and the tail is normally slate gray. Sexes look alike, but males are slightly larger and longer than females.

Although range can generally be used to separate them, the black-capped chickadee is very similar in appearance to the Carolina chickadee. The black-capped is larger on average, but this cannot be used reliably for identification. The most obvious difference between the two is in the wing feathers. In the black-capped chickadee, the wing feathers have white edges that are larger and more conspicuous than those of the Carolina chickadee. The latter is often mistaken for black-capped chickadees with feather dystrophy, which sometimes affects the appearance of the primary feathers making them look slimmer, a phenomenon caused by illnesses such as fatty liver disease in malnourished birds. Overall, the Carolina appears slightly paler colored, whereas the flanks of the black-capped can appear to have a trace of off-yellow or rusty coloration. Also, the black-capped generally has a more "ragged" looking black bib, whereas the bib of the Carolina has a more smooth-edged look. These subtle features are often even more vague in populations around where the black-capped and Carolina overlap in range (possibly the result of hybrids) and the two cannot always be distinguished as two species. The two species were formerly thought to be easily distinguished by call, but they often learn each other's vocalizations where their ranges overlap (their point of overlap is a narrow band that runs along the east-central United States, with the black-capped chickadee to the north). A bird located near the zone of overlap that sings both songs, or sings "odd-sounding" songs, cannot be positively identified solely by voice in the field.

Vocalization

The vocalizations of the black-capped chickadee are highly complex. Thirteen distinct types of vocalizations have been classified, many of which are complex and can communicate different types of information. Chickadees' complex vocalizations are likely an evolutionary adaptation to their habitat: they live and feed in dense vegetation, and even when the flock is close together, individual birds tend to be out of each other's visual range.

One of the most recognizable sounds produced, particularly by the males, is the two-note fee-bee song. It is a simple, clear whistle of two notes, identical in rhythm, the first roughly a whole-step above the second. The range of frequencies at which this song starts from varies; the complete frequency range spans roughly 1 kHz. Within this range, male chickadees can sing at various tones. The average starting frequency is around 4000 Hz. A decrease of roughly 200 Hz occurs when the first note (fee) is sung, and then another decrease around 400 Hz takes place between the end of fee and the beginning of bee. In spite of these multiple changes in frequency, though, anybody listening to the song only hears a pure, high-frequency tone. This is distinguished from the Carolina chickadee's four-note call fee-bee fee-bay; the lower notes are nearly identical but the higher fee notes are omitted, making the black-capped song like bee bay. The males sing the song only in relative isolation from other chickadees (including their mates). In late summer, some young birds sing only a single note.

A recent study found that female fee-bee songs have both similarities with and differences from male fee-bee songs. Both sexes sometimes make a faint version of the song, and this appears to be used when feeding young. When males are out in the wild, they sing this song to defend their territory or attract a mate. It is rare, but  a few accounts have been given of females singing a louder version of the fee-bee song when out alone in the wild, too. The black-capped chickadee is a monomorphic species, so distinguishing males and females based solely on their singing is difficult. A bioacoustic analysis performed on both male and female songs revealed that male fee-bee singing fluctuates more, and the absolute amplitude of both sexes is the same. The fee glissando varies far more in females, which makes identifying each sex easier. The purpose of the female fee-bee song is unknown.

The most familiar call is the chick-a-dee-dee-dee, which gave this bird its name. This simple-sounding call is astonishingly complex. Scientists have been studying it since the mid-1970s. It is produced by both males and females year-round. It has been observed to consist of up to four distinct units which can be arranged in different patterns to communicate information about threats from predators and coordination of group movement: A, B, C, and D. These four notes only ever appear in this consecutive order with each preceding note blending into the next. Not all four notes may appear in the call, though. Like other sounds the chickadee produces, it may be heard in multiple variations. The A and B notes are almost identical to one another in both frequency and duration. The black-capped chickadee possesses the ability to quickly notice the difference between these two notes. As for the C and D notes, no real similarity is seen between them. The C note fluctuates from low to high then back to low, whereas the D note has a constant frequency. While not confirmed, one study found evidence of a function behind the C and D notes. To be able to recognize the difference between a member of the same species and a potential predator, the D note is required. The C note is needed to locate food.

Neither individual notes nor groups of notes have an equal probability of appearing in the chick-a-dee-dee song. Its syntax form may take on several different structures, but the two most commonly heard are [A][D] and [B][C][D]. (The brackets are placed around each note to show that it may be repeated more than once.) Any calls that contain the D note more frequently than others are more commonly heard. A recent study of the call showed that the number of dees indicates the level of threat from nearby predators. In an analysis of over 5,000 alarm calls from chickadees,  alarm calls triggered by small, dangerous raptors had a shorter interval between chick and dee and tended to have extra dees, typically four instead of two. In one case, a warning call about a pygmy owl – a prime threat to chickadees – contained 23 dees. The Carolina chickadee makes a similar call, which is faster and higher-pitched.

These chickadees make a number of other calls and sounds, such as a gargle noise usually used by males to indicate a threat of attacking another male, often when feeding. This call is also used in sexual contexts. Black-capped chickadees develop the gargle noise as a result of learning that starts soon after birth and continues through to adulthood. This noise is among the most complex of the calls, containing two to 9 of 14 distinct notes in one population that was studied. It only lasts for about half a second. Social learning, in particular, is largely influential to the development of this sound. Beginning 30 to 35 days after birth, strings of low-amplitude precursor or sub-gargles are produced for about a minute. At this time, the young have several close interactions with their family; they learn to produce such sounds by listening to their parents and siblings. Three chickadee populations were observed at three different sites over 8 years, and all of them produced vocalizations that were very similar to one another. Strings of juvenile sub-gargles are almost perfectly continuous and both low and unstable in frequency, yet lacking multiple syllables. When their vocal abilities are fully developed, a stable frequency is produced and a variety of syllables is heard that vary in length.

Chickadees in an environment with ambient noise at the same frequencies as their songs have developed an evolutionary adaptation that enables them to adjust the frequency of their songs much quicker to effectively communicate with the surrounding population. The fee-bee songs of several male black-capped chickadees were monitored to identify their particular frequency. In one particular study, a series of both masking and nonmasking tones was played to multiple male chickadees at various locations to observe how they responded to interfering and noninterfering signals. When interacting with conspecifics close by, the males matched their frequencies, but when the surrounding environment was noisy with other species, the males adapted by increasing the frequency of their songs. The males responded quickly to the masking tones by raising their song frequencies. Another study, though, showed that male chickadees sometimes intentionally match the tones of competing conspecifics as a way of showing aggression. Dominant males in a population often compete with lower-ranked males; one is not at a greater or lesser advantage than the other. Singing contests are a way male chickadees decide who in a population gets to mate. When a male loses a contest, particularly a higher-ranking male in the population, he will often have difficulty finding a mate.

Behaviour and ecology

Diet and foraging

Insects (especially caterpillars) form a large part of their diet in summer. The birds hop along tree branches searching for food, sometimes hanging upside down or hovering; they may make short flights to catch insects in the air. Seeds and berries become more important in winter, though insect eggs and pupae remain on the menu. Black oil sunflower seeds are readily taken from bird feeders. The birds take a seed in their beak and commonly fly from the feeder to a tree, where they proceed to hammer the seed on a branch to open it.

Like many other species in the family Paridae, black-capped chickadees commonly cache food, mostly seeds, but sometimes insects, also. Items are stored singly in various sites such as bark, dead leaves, clusters of conifer needles, or knothole. Memory for the location of caches can last up to 28 days. Within the first 24 hours, the birds can even remember the relative quality of the stored items.

Foraging behaviour in the winter tends to decrease due to the changing weather. Such behaviour is largely influenced by wind and temperature. When wind speeds are higher,  black-capped chickadees avoid exposure to such conditions by flying lower where vegetation offers a degree of protection, and when the temperature decreases, they search for food less frequently.

In parts of the black-capped chickadee's range with very cold winters, such as Minnesota, survival rates are affected by access to supplemental food. Chickadees with access to bird feeders are twice as likely to survive the winter than those without access to this supplemental food. This difference in survival rates occurs primarily during months with severe weather when the temperature drops below  for more than five days.  In Pennsylvania, with milder winters on the southern edge of their range, differences between populations with and without feeders suggest that feeders influence movements of chickadees rather than actual survival.

At bird feeders, black-capped chickadees tolerate human approach to a much greater degree than other species do. In fact, during the winter, many individuals accustomed to human habitation readily accept seed from a person's hand.

Metabolism
On cold winter nights, these birds can reduce their body temperature by as much as  12 °C (from their normal temperature of about 42 °C) to conserve energy. Such a capacity for torpor is not very common in birds. Other bird species capable of torpor include the common swift (Apus apus), the common poor-will (Phalaenoptilus nuttallii), the lesser nighthawk (Chordeiles acutipennis), and various species of hummingbirds.

Movements
These birds are permanent residents, but sometimes they move south within their range, and even outside of it, in the fall or winter.

During the winter, chickadees often flock together. Many other species of birds – including titmice, nuthatches, and warblers – can often be found foraging in these flocks. Mixed flocks stay together because the chickadees call out whenever they find a good source of food. This calling-out forms cohesion for the group, allowing the other birds to find food more efficiently. When flocking, black-capped chickadees soon establish a rigid social hierarchy. In such hierarchies, males usually rank over females, and older birds over juveniles.

Black-capped chickadees sleep in thick vegetation or in cavities, usually singly, though they may occasionally roost clumped together. Their sleeping posture is with the beak tucked under the scapular (shoulder) feathers.

Their flight is slightly undulating with rapid wing beats.

Molt

Chickadees molt once a year; no prenuptial molt occurs in the spring. The postjuvenal molt at the end of the first summer of life is partial, involving only the body feathers and wing coverts. Thereafter, the postnuptial molts at the end of each reproductive season are always complete, involving all feathers.

Breeding
The pair either excavates the hole together, or uses a natural cavity, or sometimes an old woodpecker nest. This species will also nest in a nesting box. The nesting season is from late April through June. The nest is built by the female only. It consists of a base of coarse material such as moss or bark strips, and lining of finer material such as mammal hair. Eggs are white with fine dots of reddish brown concentrated at the larger end. Clutch size is six to eight eggs. Incubation lasts 11–14 days and is by the female only, which is fed by the male. If an unusual disturbance occurs at the nest entrance, the incubating female may utter an explosive hiss, like that of a snake, a probable adaptation to discourage nest predators.

Hatchlings are altricial, naked with their eyes closed. Nestlings are fed by both sexes, but are brooded by the female only (when the male brings food to her, which she passes on to the young). Young leave the nest 12–16 days  after hatching, in great part because the parents start presenting food only outside the nest hole. The young are still fed by the parents for several weeks, but are capable of catching food on their own within a week after leaving the nest.

Black-capped chickadees usually breed only once a year, but second broods are possible if the first one is lost. First breeding is at one year of age. Maximum recorded lifespan is 12 years, but most individuals live only half that long.

Black-capped chickadees are socially monogamous, and males contribute greatly to reproduction. During the laying and incubation periods, males feed their partners extensively. When the nestlings hatch, males are the primary providers, but as the nestlings grow, females become the main caretakers. Females prefer dominant males, and greater reproductive success is closely related to the higher ranking of the male.

Black-capped chickadees may interbreed with Carolina chickadees or mountain chickadees where their ranges overlap. It appears to be more rare, but interbreeding with boreal chickadees has also been documented.

Dominance hierarchy
During the winter, the species forms flocks through which dominance hierarchies can be easily observed. Dominance hierarchies play an important role in determining the social behaviors among the birds in these flocks. Positive correlates to higher social rankings include territory size, body condition, singing rate, and reproductive success. The hierarchies are linear and stable; once a relationship is established between two birds, it stays the same for many years. In general, older and more experienced birds are dominant over younger ones, and males are dominant over females. Dominant and subordinate members differ in their foraging strategies and risk-taking behaviors. Dominant individuals control access to preferred resources and restrict subordinates to foraging in novel, riskier, or suboptimal environments. Subordinate individuals are often observed foraging in the outermost tree parts that are more prone to predators, while dominant individuals forage low and close to the tree trunk. In experiments, subordinate individuals display less neophobia when approaching novel foods and objects, compared to their dominant counterparts. Subordinate individuals are also more likely to enter novel environments than their dominant counterparts. This is similar to subordinate primates, which feed on novel food more readily than the dominant individuals because they are more used to eating suboptimal and unfamiliar food. No difference is observed in ability to learn novel foraging tasks between dominant and subordinate individuals.

State and provincial bird
The black-capped chickadee is the state bird of Maine and Massachusetts and the provincial bird of New Brunswick. In 2014, the black-capped chickadee was named the official bird of Vancouver for 2015. In 2022 the black-capped chickadee was named the official bird of Calgary, Alberta. The bird is prominently featured on the standard Maine license plate, as well as welcome signs on major roadways in Massachusetts.

Conservation
The IUCN classifies the black-capped chickadee as least concern due to its wide distribution and large populations. In Alaska and Washington, and parts of western Canada, black-capped chickadees are among a number of bird species affected by an unknown agent that is causing beak deformities, which may cause stress for affected species by inhibiting feeding ability, mating, and grooming. Black-capped chickadees were the first affected bird species, with reports of the deformity beginning in Alaska in the late 1990s, but more recently the deformity has been observed in close to 30 bird species in the affected areas.

References

Further reading
Smith, S.M. (1991). The black-capped Chickadee: Behavioural Ecology and Natural History. Cornell University Press.  (1991 reprint).
Smith, S.M. (1993). Black-capped Chickadee. In The Birds of North America, no. 39. (A. Poole, P. Stettenheim and F. Gill, eds.) Philadelphia: The Academy of Natural Sciences.
Otter, K.A. (ed) (2007). "Ecology and behavior of chickadees and titmice: an integrated approach". Oxford University Press, Oxford.  310 pp

External links

 
 Alaska Science Center: Beak Deformities
 
 Black-capped chickadee – Poecile atricapilla – USGS Patuxent Bird Identification InfoCenter
 Black-capped chickadee species account – Cornell Lab of Ornithology
 

black-capped chickadee
Native birds of Alaska
Birds of Canada
Birds of the United States
Birds of North America
Provincial symbols of New Brunswick
black-capped chickadee
Taxa named by Carl Linnaeus